The Republic of Vietnam Leadership Medal was a five-grade decoration awarded by South Vietnam. Established in 1964, the medal was awarded to South Vietnamese military commanders by the Chief of the Joint General Staff, Republic of Vietnam Military Forces.

Criteria
The Loyalty Medal was awarded to South Vietnamese military commanders who had shown excellent leadership in "combat, operations, training, troop discipline, and morale". The medal was awarded in five different classes depending on the level of command. It was awarded for commander at the Armed Forces, Corps, Division, Brigade, Regiment, Battalion, and Company levels.

Appearance
The Leadership medal is a bronze colored medal. Its pendant depicts a four-pointed star. Between the arms of the star are two swords pointed up with a green laurel wreath behind the swords. The medal hangs from a white ribbon with green edges and a red center stripe. The class of award is shown by a ribbon attachment that is similar in appearance to the military map symbol of the unit level the recipient commanded.

See also 
Orders, decorations, and medals of South Vietnam

References

Military awards and decorations of Vietnam